The spectacled spiderhunter (Arachnothera flavigaster) is a species of bird in the family Nectariniidae.
It is found in Brunei, Indonesia, Malaysia, Singapore, Thailand, and Vietnam.
Its natural habitats are subtropical or tropical moist lowland forest and subtropical or tropical moist montane forest. This is both the largest spiderhunter and the largest representative of the entire sunbird 
family.

References

spectacled spiderhunter
Birds of Malesia
spectacled spiderhunter
spectacled spiderhunter
Taxonomy articles created by Polbot